Holly Springs is an unincorporated community in Spartanburg County, in the U.S. state of South Carolina.

History
The community derives its name from a nearby spring lined with holly.

References

Unincorporated communities in Spartanburg County, South Carolina
Unincorporated communities in South Carolina